Philip "Flip" Benham (born April 16, 1948) is an Evangelical Christian minister and the national leader of Concord, North Carolina-based Operation Save America, an anti-abortion group that evolved from Operation Rescue.

Recent activities

Benham has spoken out against hate crime legislation that would include legal protections for victims of anti-gay bias crimes, asserting the legislation "expressly forbids any language that might be perceived as 'hate' by the homosexual community. This makes illegal every word in the Bible."

On August 6, 2010, Benham organized an anti-Islam protest at a Bridgeport, Connecticut mosque. About a dozen protesters confronted worshippers outside the mosque. The protesters screamed "Jesus hates Muslims" and "Islam is a lie". One protester shoved a placard at a group of young children leaving the mosque. "Murderers," he shouted. Benham was also speaking to the worshipers with a bullhorn. "This is a war in America and we are taking it to the mosques around the country," he said.

He has had various run-ins with the police. On July 1, 2011, a Charlotte, North Carolina jury found Benham guilty of stalking a Charlotte-area physician. Benham and his supporters took pictures of the doctor, his house, and the interior of his clinic, and later distributed photographs of the doctor captioned with "Wanted ... By Christ, to Stop Killing Babies". Benham was sentenced to 18 months probation and ordered to stay at least 500 feet from the victim.

On October 13, 2014, Benham staged a protest in Charlotte, North Carolina, outside the office of the Mecklenburg County Register of Deeds, where some of the first marriage licenses for same-sex couples were being issued, and while some of those couples were in the midst of wedding ceremonies nearby.

On January 23, 2018, police escorted Benham out of a meeting of the Charlotte-Mecklenburg school board after he violated protocol by approaching the board members at the dais, while shouting and pointing at board members, after his allotted time to address the board had expired.

On February 24, 2018, Benham was arrested in Charlotte and charged with communicating threats.  The arrest happened during an anti-abortion protest. Nonprofit group Progress NC reported that Benham was arrested outside A Preferred Women’s Health Center, “despite a protective order warning him to stay away from a clinic volunteer.”

References 

1948 births
North Carolina Constitutionalists
American anti-abortion activists
Religious leaders from Syracuse, New York
American Christian clergy
Living people
Free Methodist Church ministers
Baptists from New York (state)